WHQC (96.1 FM, "Hits 96.1") is an American radio station in Charlotte, North Carolina. Licensed to serve the city of Shelby, North Carolina, it is owned by iHeartMedia. WHQC broadcasts a Top 40 (CHR) format branded as "Hits 96.1." Its transmitter is located in Dallas, North Carolina, and its studios are located along with the rest of iHeartMedia's Charlotte stations in the Wood Ridge Center office complex off Billy Graham Parkway in south Charlotte. WHQC's primary competitor is WNKS, owned by Beasley Broadcast Group.

WHQC is licensed to broadcast in the HD Radio format. HD-1 is a simulcast of the analog "All the Hits" broadcast signal, while HD-2 signal is known as "Air1" which programs Contemporary Worship music on W262BM 100.3 FM and the HD-3 signal airs a Contemporary Christian format called "HIS Radio".

History
The station was established in 1948 as WOHS-FM, which complemented its AM sister station WOHS out of Shelby, North Carolina.  In 1978, the station increased its signal power to cover the far western portion of Charlotte and expanded its coverage as WXIK, adopting a Top 40 format as "K-96" that was heavy on "deep cut" rock hits. Air staff at WXIK included longtime PD/MD Jeffrey Owens, longtime Shelby personality Andy Foster, Vince Goolio, J. Worthington Smith, Eddie Bridges, Dawne Conrad, Don Richards, Rusty Price, Kent Dorsey, Scott Miller, Jeff Champion, and Bob Davis.  On February 27, 1987, at 5:30 a.m., the station boosted its signal again to a full 100,000 watts, allowing it to cover the entire Charlotte area. At the same time, the station adopted a gold-based adult contemporary format under new  call letters, WWMG ("Magic 96"). By early 1989, the station flipped to oldies.

As WWMG, the station was Charlotte's radio home of the North Carolina Tar Heels from 1991 to 1995.

Even though the oldies format remained successful for nearly two decades, its later years deemed less successful. At Midnight on September 1, 2004, after playing "American Pie" by Don McLean, WWMG began stunting. At 3 p.m. the following day, WWMG flipped to Rhythmic Top 40, branded as "96.1 The Beat." The WIBT calls were chosen shortly afterwards, even though it created confusion between it and Charlotte station WBT, which also has a spot on the FM dial as well.

Despite the controversy that ensued, WIBT became a success story when it went to #1 in the Fall 2004 Arbitron ratings.  As a Rhythmic Top 40 formatted station, WIBT was in competition with long-time Urban heritage station WPEG and Pop station WNKS. Although its music tended to favor hip hop, WIBT played pop and dance crossovers that were hits.  In early September 2010, WIBT segued into a mainstream CHR format, going head-to-head with WNKS with the positioner "All The Hits." On December 10, 2010, after the station saw its ratings slip from 5.8 in Arbitron's September PPM to a 4.1 in November's PPM ratings report, WIBT rebranded as "Channel 96-1", retaining the "All The Hits" positioner. On August 31, 2011, WIBT changed their call letters to WHQC.

Christopher "Brotha Fred" Frederick's last night co-hosting Fox News Edge on WCCB was December 16, 2010. The next day, WIBT announced that Frederick, the station's morning co-host since June 2006, would begin originating the show from Chicago on January 3, 2011. Joining Frederick would be David L, who was already part of the WIBT show, and Angi Taylor of Chicago. Frederick's "AM Mayhem" would also be heard on Chicago's WKSC-FM as well as WMKS in High Point and WKXJ in Chattanooga.

On December 16, 2011, it was announced that longtime Charlotte morning radio hosts Ace & TJ would be replacing Fred, beginning January 5, 2012. Ace & TJ left the station in July 2021, and moved back to their former station WNKS in July 2022 in a mid-morning timeslot. 

Brooke Morrison joined the Channel 96-1 team for afternoons on March 26, 2018 after being the producer for Nina Chantele on KRRL in Los Angeles.

On January 4, 2019, WHQC rebranded as "Hits 96.1".

Previous logos

References

External links
Hits 96.1 Online

Tragic96.com - WWMG memorial site

HQC
Contemporary hit radio stations in the United States
Radio stations established in 1948
1948 establishments in North Carolina
IHeartMedia radio stations